The Center for International Environmental Law (CIEL) is a public nonprofit environmental law firm based in Geneva, Switzerland with an office in Washington, DC, United States. It was founded in 1989. CIEL's team aims to "strength and use international law to protect the environment, promote human health, and ensure a environmental friendly society." They help educate organizations, corporations, and the public on environmental issues and conduct their own research. Carroll Muffett has been the president and CEO of CIEL since September 2010. CIEL also offers internship, externship, and fellowship programs.

Issues
CIEL's work can be divided into three programs: Climate and Energy; Environmental Health; and People, Land, and Resources. Actions to protect environment and human rights include "collaborating to improve safeguard policies, increasing access to information through the Early Warning System, and supporting community-driven advocacy and complaints at the accountability mechanisms of multilateral banks." Areas of interest include biodiversity, chemicals, climate change, human rights, environmental rights, international financial institutions, law and communities, plastic, and trade and sustainable development.

Research
CIEL has published several research reports and articles. Smoke and Fumes (2017) examined the oil and gas industry's efforts to fund the science and propaganda of climate denial, and has been cited in climate litigation against carbon majors. Plastic & Health (2019) and Plastic & Climate (2019) have been featured in publications that seek to explain the impact of the plastic crisis on health, climate, and the environment. In 2020, Pandemic Crisis, Systemic Decline examined the oil, gas, and petrochemical industry's attempts to use the COVID-19 pandemic for their own gain. In 2022, Pushing Back, a report about the petrochemical industry's development and what that means for communities, was published.

References

International environmental organizations
1989 establishments in Washington, D.C.
International law organizations
1989 establishments in Switzerland
Environmental law in the European Union